During the closing ceremony of the 2018 Winter Olympics in Pyeongchang, the flag bearers of 92 National Olympic Committees (NOCs) arrived into Pyeongchang Olympic Stadium on February 25. The flag bearers from each participating country entered the stadium informally in single file, and behind them marched all the athletes. The flags of each country were not necessarily carried by the same flag bearer as in the opening ceremony. The flag-bearers entered in ganada order of the Korean alphabet.

Unlike the opening ceremony, North and South Korea used their own flags in addition to the Korean Unification Flag. Thus there were a total of 93 flag bearers representing 92 NOCs, with the North Korean flag and Korean Unification Flag appearing earlier in the parade order, and the South Korean flag appearing last.

Countries and flagbearers
The following is a list of each country's flag bearer. The list is sorted by the order in which each nation appears in the parade of nations. Names are given as were officially designated by the International Olympic Committee (IOC).

References

closing ceremony flag bearers
Lists of Olympic flag bearers